Qualifying for the 2009 FIBA Americas Championship the basketball championships for the Americas (North America, Central America, the Caribbean and South America) began on August 12, 2007 at the FIBA CBC Championship for national teams from the Caribbean. Three teams qualified from that tournament to the 2008 Centrobasket, from which four automatic berths are available.

South American teams qualified via the 2008 South American Basketball Championship, held at Puerto Montt, Chile. North American teams (Canada and the United States) automatically qualify to the championship, which will be held in San Juan, Puerto Rico. The top four teams from the 2009 Championships qualify automatically to the 2010 FIBA World Championship in Turkey, with FIBA handling out four more wild card entries to complete the 24-team tournament.

With the United States winning the gold medal at the 2008 men's Olympic basketball tournament, another slot was opened for a Centrobasket participant, when the United States decided to skip qualification since their gold medal provided them automatic qualification to the 2010 FIBA World Championship.

2007 CBC Championship
The 2007 CBC Championship was held from August 6 to 12, 2007, at Caguas, Puerto Rico. The top three teams at the end of the tournament qualify for the 2008 Centrobasket.

Group A
*Points between games of tied teams, then goal averages between the games of tied teams.

Group B

Knockout stage

Championship bracket
Italicized teams advanced to the 2008 Centrobasket.

Classification

2008 Centrobasket

The 2008 Centrobasket was held from August 27 to 31, 2008, at Chetumal and Cancun, Mexico. The top four teams automatically go to the Tournament of the Americas. With the US not participating, the fifth-placed team also qualifies.
Italicized teams advanced to the FIBA Americas Championship 2009.

Group A
*Points between games of tied teams, then goal averages between the games of tied teams.

Group B

Knockout stage

Championship bracket

Classification

2008 South American Basketball Championship

The 2008 South American Basketball Championship was held from July 1 to 6, at Puerto Montt, Chile. The top four teams qualify to the Tournament of the Americas.

Preliminary round
Italicized teams advanced to the FIBA Americas Championship 2009.
*Points between games of tied teams, then goal averages between the games of tied teams.

Finals

Did not enter

Qual
FIBA AmeriCup qualification